Justice Goodenow may refer to:

Daniel Goodenow, associate justice of the Maine Supreme Judicial Court
John M. Goodenow, associate justice of the Supreme Court of Ohio
John Richard Goodnow, associate justice of the New Hampshire Supreme Court